Admiral Sir George Michael Zambellas,  (born 4 April 1958) is a retired Royal Navy officer. He was the First Sea Lord and Chief of the Naval Staff from April 2013 until he handed over duties to Admiral Sir Philip Jones in April 2016.

In his early career he served as a helicopter pilot with 814 Naval Air Squadron, 829 Naval Air Squadron and then 815 Naval Air Squadron. As captain of  he was deployed as part of Operation Palliser off Sierra Leone, for which he received the Distinguished Service Cross in 2001. He went on to be Fleet Commander and Deputy Chief of the Naval Staff in early 2012.

Early life and education
Born in Swansea, Wales, the son of a Greek father, Michael George Zambellas and Rosemary Frederique Zambellas (née Lindsay), Zambellas was educated at Shabani Primary School in Southern Rhodesia (now Zimbabwe), and at Stowe School. He studied aeronautical and astronautical engineering at the University of Southampton and graduated in 1980 with a Bachelor of Science (BSc hons) degree.

Career

Zambellas was commissioned as an acting sub-lieutenant in the Royal Navy on 17 September 1980. He was promoted to lieutenant on 16 May 1982 and served with 814 Naval Air Squadron, 829 Naval Air Squadron and 815 Naval Air Squadron in his early career.

Zambellas was trained for the naval staff at Greenwich in 1990, and after spending a short time as a corporate planner for the Royal Navy's manpower and training division within the Ministry of Defence, he took command of the mine-sweeper  in 1991. His next appointment was ashore, as an aviation operations officer in the Fleet Headquarters at Northwood, before being promoted to commander on 30 June 1994. In 1995 he was given command of the frigate  and was deployed on counter-narcotics operations in the Caribbean.

Zambellas served as a corporate planner during the 1997–98 Strategic Defence Review before returning to operational command in 1999 as captain of the frigate  and being deployed as part of Operation Palliser off Sierra Leone for which he received the Distinguished Service Cross in 2001. In 2001 he took the Higher Command and Staff Course at Shrivenham before becoming Deputy Flag Officer Sea Training, responsible for training Royal Navy and foreign warships and auxiliaries.

Promoted to commodore in 2002, Zambellas was appointed to be principal staff officer to the Chief of the Defence staff and served Admiral Boyce and General Walker during the invasion of Iraq and the early days of its fallout. He was given command of the Royal Navy's Amphibious Task Group in January 2005.

Promoted to rear admiral on 29 August 2006 and appointed Chief of staff (Transformation), Zambellas was in this role entrusted with "designing and delivering the Fleet's new approach to the generation of maritime capability and support to operations." In 2007, he became Commander United Kingdom Maritime Force, and in October 2008, he became Chief of staff (Operations) at the UK's Permanent Joint Headquarters at Northwood.

Promoted vice admiral in January 2011, Zambellas was appointed Deputy Commander-in-Chief Fleet, Chief of staff to Navy Command Headquarters, and Chief Naval Warfare Officer. He became Commander-in-Chief Fleet in January 2012 and was promoted admiral on 6 January 2013. In April 2012 his role was re-designated Fleet Commander and Deputy Chief of the Naval Service.

Zambellas was appointed Knight Commander of the Order of the Bath (KCB) in the 2012 Birthday Honours and became First Sea Lord and Chief of the Naval staff on 9 April 2013. As of 2015, Zambellas was paid a salary of between £180,000 and £184,999 by the department, making him one of the 328 most highly paid people in the British public sector at that time.

On 15 April 2014, Zambellas wrote an op-ed piece in the Daily Telegraph that laid out the case for a "No" vote in the 2014 Scottish independence referendum.  He said it would weaken the maritime defence of the UK. Despite this, on 12 November 2014 he was publicly overruled by the UK Defence Secretary after suggesting to a journalist that the contract for Type 26 frigates may not be awarded to Scottish shipyards.

On 4 July 2014, Zambellas was among those attending the launch ceremony of the 70,600-tonne Royal Navy aircraft carrier HMS Queen Elizabeth, the largest warship ever built in the United Kingdom, and formally named by Queen Elizabeth II.

Honours and awards
Zambellas was appointed Knight Grand Cross of the Order of the Bath (GCB) in the 2016 New Year Honours attending an investiture for this at a ceremony at Windsor Castle along with Air Chief Marshal Sir Andrew Pulford on 13 April 2016. He handed over duties as First Sea Lord to Admiral Sir Philip Jones in April 2016.

Zambellas is a Younger Brother of Trinity House.  He is also an Honorary Freeman of the Worshipful Company of Merchant Taylors.

Zambellas was elected Fellow of the Royal Aeronautical Society (FRAeS) in 2009. In September 2013, he was appointed a Deputy Lieutenant (DL) of Dorset.

Personal life
In 1982 Zambellas married Amanda Jane LeCudennec; they have three sons.

References

|-

|-

|-

|-

|-

Military personnel from Swansea
Royal Navy admirals
First Sea Lords and Chiefs of the Naval Staff
Living people
British people of Greek descent
Alumni of the University of Southampton
Knights Grand Cross of the Order of the Bath
Recipients of the Distinguished Service Cross (United Kingdom)
Deputy Lieutenants of Dorset
People educated at Stowe School
British military personnel of the Sierra Leone Civil War
Royal Navy personnel of the Iraq War
1958 births
Helicopter pilots
People from Zvishavane
Fellows of the Royal Aeronautical Society
Members of Trinity House